Shelby is the debut studio album by American rapper Lil Skies. It was released on February 28, 2019, by All We Got Entertainment and Atlantic Records. The album features guest appearances from Gucci Mane, Landon Cube, and Gunna. It peaked at number five on the US Billboard 200. The album is named after his mother. It serves as the follow up to his breakthrough mixtape, Life of a Dark Rose (2018).

Background
Lil Skies dedicated the album to his mother, who appears in the album title and cover. It describes the hard times he has gone through with the help of his fans.

Release and promotion
On February 27, 2019, a day before the album was released, Lil Skies revealed the title and cover art of the album through Twitter.

Singles
On January 31, 2019, Skies released the lead single from the project, "Name in the Sand". On March 1, 2019, "I" was released as the second and final single along with the album, debuting at number 39 on the Billboard Hot 100, becoming the highest-charting single of Skies' career.

Commercial performance
Shelby debuted at number five on the US Billboard 200 chart, earning 54,000 album-equivalent units (including 6,000 copies as pure album sales) in its first week. This became Lil Skies' second US top-ten album on the chart, surpassing his debut mixtape and first project, Life of a Dark Rose (2018), which went at number 10 on the chart. The album also accumulated a total of 68.6 million on-demand audio streams that week. On January 21, 2021, the day before Skies released the follow-up to the album, his second studio album, Unbothered, the album was certified gold by the Recording Industry Association of America (RIAA) for combined sales and album-equivalent units of over 500,000 units in the United States.

Track listing

Charts

Weekly charts

Year-end charts

Certifications

References

2019 albums
Lil Skies albums
Albums produced by Cubeatz